Nick Offerman: American Ham is a 2014 American stand-up comedy film, directed by Jordan Vogt-Roberts. It is written by the American actor, writer and carpenter, Nick Offerman. The film had its world premiere at the 2014 Sundance Film Festival on January 23, 2014. The special was removed from Netflix in December 2017.

Plot
The film is a live taping of Offerman's one-man show at the Town Hall theater in New York, with a collection of anecdotes, songs and woodworking/oral-sex techniques.

Cast
Nick Offerman as himself
Megan Mullally as herself (cameo)
Marc Evan Jackson as Llawyer

Reception
Nick Offerman: American Ham received mostly positive reviews from critics. Geoffrey Berkshire of Variety, said in his review that "Nick Offerman's affable stage presence carries this fairly routine standup concert film". John DeFore, in his review for The Hollywood Reporter, wrote, "The stand-up film won't please all fans of Offerman's acting work." Kyle Burton of Indiewire graded the film a B−, saying, ""American Ham" is a solid comedy special — with stylish prerecorded title sequences for each new Tip — but it lacks some of the inventiveness or surprise that might otherwise warrant a slot at a major film festival. But that doesn't negate the way Offerman’s honest Americanist attitude regularly leads to laughs and insight."

References

External links
 
 

2014 films
2014 comedy films
American comedy films
Films directed by Jordan Vogt-Roberts
Films shot in New York City
Netflix specials
Stand-up comedy concert films
2010s English-language films
2010s American films